Let 'Em Have It is a 1935 American gangster film directed by Sam Wood. The film was also known under the title False Faces in the United Kingdom and The Legion of Valour in Australia.

Plot
An FBI agent tracks down a gang leader.

Cast

Richard Arlen as Mal Stevens
Virginia Bruce as Eleanor Spencer
Alice Brady as Aunt Ethel
Bruce Cabot as Joe Keefer
Harvey Stephens as Van Rensseler
Eric Linden as Buddy Spencer
Joyce Compton as Barbara
Gordon Jones as Tex
J. Farrell MacDonald as Mr. Keefer
Bodil Rosing as Mrs. Keefer
Paul Stanton as Department Chief
Hale Hamilton as Ex-Senator Reilly
Robert Emmett O'Connor as Police Captain
Dorothy Appleby as Lola
Barbara Pepper as Milly
Paul Fix as Sam

Production
The film was shot at Pathe Studios. It was one of a series of movies that came out around this time about "G-Men". with the film giving the audience a look an FBI Headquarters and the training of a Special Agent.

References

External links
 

1935 films
American black-and-white films
1935 crime drama films
American crime drama films
Films produced by Edward Small
1930s English-language films
Films directed by Sam Wood
1930s American films